Veryl A. Switzer (August 6, 1932 – June 4, 2022) was an American professional football player who was a halfback  in the National Football League (NFL) and the Canadian Football League (CFL). He played in the NFL for 24 games with the Green Bay Packers before serving in the United States Air Force for two years, playing professional football in Canada, and becoming an administrator at his alma mater Kansas State where he is a hall of famer.

Career
In 1954, the Green Bay Packers used the 4th pick in the 1st round of the 1954 NFL Draft to sign Switzer out of Kansas State University where he played from 1951 to 1953. He held the career punt return record at KSU until 1995 and scored the second longest punt return touchdown in school history (93 yards on Sept 19 1953, one of two he posted that year). His best year was 1953 when he led Kansas State in rushing with 558 yards, receiving with eight catches for 211 yards, scoring with eight touchdowns and 49 points, punt returns with a 31.0-yard average and kick returns with a 22.3-yard average.  Switzer was invited to the 1954 East–West Shrine Game.

Switzer went on to play for two seasons with the Packers before serving two years in the United States Air Force as a first lieutenant. His attempt to resume his NFL career was unsuccessful when he was released by the Packers in September 1958. He headed north to professional football in the Canadian Football League with the Calgary Stampeders in 1958 and was subsequently traded to the Montreal Alouettes in March 1959. He played two seasons with that team.

Later years
Switzer later worked for the Chicago Board of Education for ten years before returning to Kansas State as an administrator in 1969.  He received a Masters in Education from Kansas State in 1974. He was Co-Director, Earl Woods National Youth Golf Academy and Associate Athletic Director for Academics. Switzer developed Kansas State's first university-wide student minority program, including numerous programs which are still extant, including Ebony Theater, United Black Voices, a Black Student Union, and Hispanic advocacy groups.

He was a charter member of the K-State Sports Hall of Fame. He is enshrined in the Kansas Sports Hall of Fame and the Kansas High School Activities Association Hall of Fame.

Death
Switzer died in Manhattan, Kansas, on June 4, 2022, at the age of 89.

References

Packers.com
NFL.com

1932 births
2022 deaths
20th-century African-American sportspeople
African-American players of American football
African-American players of Canadian football
People from Graham County, Kansas
Players of American football from Kansas
American football halfbacks
Kansas State Wildcats football players
Green Bay Packers players
Calgary Stampeders players
Montreal Alouettes players